Georgia Blue is the eighth studio album released by Jason Isbell, and the fifth accompanied by his backing band the 400 Unit. It was released first on streaming services on October 15, 2021, through Southeastern Records, with a CD and Vinyl (for Record Store Day Black Friday).

Background
On November 5, 2020, Isbell announced on Twitter that if Joe Biden won the state of Georgia in the 2020 United States presidential election, he would record a charity album featuring covers of songs by Georgia artists. After it was projected that Biden had won the state, along with the subsequent double Senate runoff election wins of Senate Democrats Jon Ossoff and Raphael Warnock, he reaffirmed on Twitter that he was being serious and that he would begin work on the album shortly.

Track listing

Charts

References

2021 albums
Covers albums
Jason Isbell albums